Marie-Jo Zarb is a French lyricist, director and producer.

Career 

After literature studies, Marie-Jo Zarb meets Bruno Pelletier, the francophone Quebecer singer, in 1993, and writes many songs for him. Thanks to this first experience, she works with Native, a French band, and with Francis Lai for the musical Les Sales Gosses. She gets into Sony, the record company, and writes for Herbert Léonard, Larusso and the Sol En Si artists; among others.

In 2000, she meets Pascal Obispo, Lionel Florence, gets into Atletico songwriters pole, where she writes, in particular for Patrick Fiori, Lââm, Julie Zenatti, Tina Arena, Patricia Kaas, Florent Pagny.

In 2009, she is involved in the French adaptation of Zorro (musical), with Laurent Bàn in the title role, then founds Aeternalis Music, her own production company, with Sylvain Bonnet.

She sits at the variety committee at the French Sacem and runs writing workshops at The Music Academy International in Nancy.

In 2013, she writes and produces Pinocchio, the musical, for the stage, from Carlo Collodi’s novel, in Paris. Moria Nemo writes the music and Pablo Villafranca, Nuno Resende, Sophie Delmas and Vanessa Cailhol play the leading parts. Marie-Jo Zarb is nominated for the French Prix de la Création Musicale, with the song Couper les liens.

Exhaustive list of collaborations 
 1995 : Je n'attends plus demain, Lié par le sang, Pris au piège, En manque de toi, Ailleurs c'est comme ici - Bruno Pelletier
 1995 : Sans différences, sans contre-jour - Album Sol En Si
 1998 : Regarde-moi, Une autre histoire - Herbert Léonard
 1999 : Vivre sa vie, S'en aller, Personne n'est à personne - Bruno Pelletier
 1999 : Rien ne peut séparer, Si le ciel, Come back to me - Larusso
 2000 : Matin de blues, Saoul de mes dessous - Gunvor
 2000 : Juste une raison encore - Patrick Fiori
 2000 : Tout s'en va, Pour y croire encore - Julie Zenatti
 2001 : On n'oublie pas d'où l'on vient - Florent Pagny et Pascal Obispo
 2001 : Laissez nous croire, Que l'amour nous garde, Une vie ne suffit pas - Lââm
 2001 : Juste pour quelqu'un, Après, Tout le monde pleure - Pablo Villafranca
 2001 : Si je ne t'aimais pas - Tina Arena
 2002 : On s'en va - Christiana Marocco
 2002 : Tant qu'il nous reste - Cylia
 2002 : Là où tu rêves - Jenifer
 2002 : Les diamants sont solitaires - Natasha St-Pier
 2003 : J'avais quelqu'un, Quand aimer ne suffit pas - Natasha St-Pier
 2003 : Je regarde là-haut - Thierry Amiel
 2003 : Jure-moi, Être une femme - Nolwenn Leroy
 2003 : Tant que tu vis - Solidarité inondations
 2003 : Tu pourras dire - Patricia Kaas
 2004 : Grandir c'est te dire que je t'aime - Natasha St-Pier
 2004 : Tu m'as donné - Laetizia
 2005 : Tant que tu es - Daniel Lévi
 2006 : Je peux tout quitter - Natasha St-Pier
 2006 : J'irai chanter - Nouvelle Star
 2008 : Tu pourras dire - Tina Arena
 2008 : Des funambules - Murray Head
 2010 : La vie n'attend pas - Myriam Abel
 2012 : Peut-être - Bruno Pelletier
 2012 : Te revoir - George Perris
 2013 : Ça me suffira, L'amour à mort, Après la passion - Lisa Angell

Musicals 
 1996 : Les sales gossesby Francis Lai
 2009 : Zorro by Stephen Clark, adaptation by Éric Taraud and Marie-Jo Zarb, dir Christopher Renshaw, music Gipsy Kings - Folies Bergère
 2011 : 80 jours : Un pari est un pari by Marie-Jo Zarb and Moria Némo - Zénith d'Orléans
 2013-2014 : Pinocchio, le spectacle musical by Marie-Jo Zarb and Moria Némo - Théâtre de Paris, tournée
 2014 : Aladin, le spectacle musical by David Rozen and Marie-Jo Zarb - Zénith d'Orléans

Filmography 
 2002 : The Biggest Fan de Michael Criscione

Awards and nominations

Nominations 
 2014 : Prix de la création musicale originale pour un spectacle : Couper les liens, written with Stéphanie Mounier, from Pinocchio, le spectacle musical

References

External links 
  
 Aeternalis, official site 

Living people
French songwriters
Place of birth missing (living people)
French record producers
Year of birth missing (living people)